Widefield High School is a high school in Security-Widefield, Colorado, United States. It opened its doors in 1958 and is the older of the two high schools in Widefield School District 3. Widefield's mascot is the Gladiator and its colors are navy blue, Columbia blue, silver and white.

Athletics 

Widefield High School competes in the 4-A Pikes Peak Athletic Conference. The Gladiators play their home games for both football and soccer at C.A. Foster Stadium, which is shared with Mesa Ridge High School. Widefield plays their home baseball games down the street from the school at the Widefield Community Center.

Recently Widefield High School has enjoyed much success in football, baseball, basketball, wrestling, and soccer, with football making it to the 2010 state playoffs. The school's district rival is Mesa Ridge High School. The Gladiators also have a rival in nearby Fountain-Fort Carson High School.

In 1970, the Widefield boys' basketball team lost the AAA State Championship game to Cherry Creek. They only lost one game in the regular season, to Harrison, to finish with a 21-2 record overall. They later won the 5A basketball state championship in 1985. On March 15, 2008, the Widefield Gladiators boys' basketball team competed in the 2008 State Boys Basketball Championship game. The team ended up losing 63-59 to the Lincoln Lancers, becoming the state runners-up.

Performing arts 
The Widefield High School performing arts program is one of the best in the district. The Chamber Orchestra won 1st place in the Cavalcade Showcase of Music competition, regarded as
"one of America’s first-class high school and middle school music competitions" and a spot to perform at the prestigious Colorado Music Educator's Association conference at The Broadmoor.

Fight song 

Widefield High School's fight song is "The Victors".

Notable alumni 

 Boris Berian, track and field athlete
 Darryl Clack (born 1963), NFL running back
 Sean Hill (born 1971), NFL defensive back
 Tom Hovasse (born 1967), NBA forward
 Paul Hubbard (born 1985), NFL wide receiver
 Vincent Jackson (1983-2021),Former NFL wide receiver
 Brian Walker (born 1972), NFL safety

References

External links 
 

Public high schools in Colorado
Schools in El Paso County, Colorado